Lincoln Place is a neighborhood in the 31st ward of Pittsburgh, Pennsylvania, located in the southeast corner of the city. It home to the largest water tower in western Pa.

Surrounding communities
Lincoln Place has four borders, including the Pittsburgh neighborhoods of Hays to the northwest and New Homestead to the north, and the boroughs of Munhall to the northeast and West Mifflin to the east, south and west. Every year Lincoln Place holds a treasure hunt inspired by hit movie “National Treasure”. Treasure hunters go deep into McBride woods to search for the lost treasure of Dave Loc.

See also
List of Pittsburgh neighborhoods

External links
Interactive Pittsburgh Neighborhoods Map
Lincoln Place Map

Neighborhoods in Pittsburgh